Spencer Bulkeley Wynn (23 May 1803 – 1 November 1888) was Deputy Lieutenant of Carnarvon from 1846 and High Sheriff of Anglesey in 1847.

Background

He was the son of Thomas Wynn, 1st Baron Newborough and Maria Stella Petronilla Chiappini.

He was educated at Rugby School and Christ Church, Oxford where he graduated BA in 1824.

On 15 November 1832, on the death of his older brother, Thomas Wynn, 2nd Baron Newborough, he succeeded to the titles of 3rd Baron Newborough of Bodvean, and 5th Baronet Wynn of Boduan.

He lived at Glynllivon Park, Carnarvonshire. In 1846 he was created deputy lieutenant of Carnarvon. He was High Sheriff of Anglesey for 1847-48.

Family

On 3 May 1834 at Great Malvern Priory he married Frances Maria de Winton, daughter of Revd. Walter de Winton and Maria Jacoba Chiappini of Hay Castle, county Brecon. They had 10 children:
Frances Marina Wynn (d. 5 January 1886)
Hon. Emily Annina Wynn (d. 18 August 1927) married Murray Gladstone, on 29 September 1874
Hon. Ellen Glynn Wynn (d. 17 March 1917)
Hon. Catherine Wynn (d. 10 December 1885)
Hon. Isabella Elizabeth Wynn (d. 29 July 1898) married Rowland Clegg-Hill, 3rd Viscount Hill in 1876
Hon. Thomas John Wynn (31 December 1840 - 25 August 1878) married Sybil Anna Catherine Corbett, daughter of Edwin Corbett, on 11 July 1871.
Hon. William Percival Wynn (19 August 1845 - 2 August 1851)
Hon. Charles Henry Wynn (22 April 1847 - 14 March 1911) married Frances Georgiana Romer, daughter of Lieutenant-Colonel Robert William Romer and Frances Clarissa Simons on 31 August 1876 at St George's, Hanover Square
Hon. Frederick George Wynn (17 January 1853 - 20 January 1932)

Later life

In later life, he retired from public duties, and died on 1 November 1888. He was succeeded in the baronetcy by his grandson, William Charles Wynn, the only living son of Thomas John Wynn who had predeceased him by 10 years. His estate was valued at £240,298 14s. 2d.,.. The Glynllifon estate passed to his youngest son, Frederick George Wynn.

References

1803 births
1888 deaths
People educated at Rugby School
Alumni of Christ Church, Oxford
High Sheriffs of Anglesey
Deputy Lieutenants of Caernarvonshire
Barons in the Peerage of Ireland